Raharney Ringfort  is a ringfort located in County Westmeath, Ireland and a National Monument.

Location
Raharney Ringfort is located immediately west of Raharney village, just south of the R156.

History
Raths were ancient circular fortified settlements or homesteads in Gaelic Ireland (i.e. prior to 1170). The name is from the Irish Ráth Fhearna (ringfort of alder) or Ráth Athairne (ringfort of Athirne, a mythical poet).

Description
The rath is relatively small, covering . it is visible today as a slight hill in the middle of a field, covered in trees.

References

Archaeological sites in County Westmeath
National Monuments in County Westmeath